The Father Who Moves Mountains is a 2021 film written and directed by Daniel Sandu and starring Adrian Titieni, Elena Purea and Judith State.

Cast
 Adrian Titieni as Mircea
 Elena Purea as Paula
 Judith State as Alina
 Valeriu Andriuta as Cristian Nistor
 Virgil Aioanei as Laurentiu
 Radu Botar as Doru
 Petronela Grigorescu as Valentina
 Tudor Smoleanu as Filip
 Bogdan Nechifor as Lupu
 Cristian Bota as Marian
 George Constantinescu as Operatorul Misiunii
 Natalia Calin as Mama turistei
 Marina Palii as Receptionera
 Constantin Florescu as Managerul Hotelului
 Lucian Iftime as Ofiterul de politie

References

External links
 

2020s Romanian-language films
2021 films
Romanian thriller drama films
2021 thriller drama films